May Your Kindness Remain is the sixth studio album by American singer-songwriter Courtney Marie Andrews. It was released on March 23, 2018 via Fat Possum Records.

Critical reception

May Your Kindness Remain was met with generally favorable reviews from critics. At Metacritic, which assigns a weighted average rating out of 100 to reviews from mainstream publications, this release received an average score of 79, based on nine reviews. The aggregator AnyDecentMusic? has the critical consensus of the album at a 7.5 out of 10, based on fourteen reviews. The aggregator Album of the Year assessed the critical consensus as 78 out of 100, based on ten reviews.

Accolades

Track listing

Personnel
 Courtney Marie Andrews – vocals, acoustic and electric guitar
 Dillon Warnek – electric guitar, space uke
 Daniel Walker – organ, Wurlitzer, accordion
 Charles Wicklander – Wurlitzer, piano
 William Mapp – drums, percussion
 Alex Sabel – bass
 C.C. White – background vocals

Additional musicians
 Annie Jantzer – background vocals (track 8)
 Kara Hesse – background vocals (track 8)

Charts

References

External links

2018 albums
Fat Possum Records albums
Courtney Marie Andrews albums